Matěj Zahálka (born 4 December 1993) is a Czech racing cyclist, who currently rides for UCI Continental team . He won the Czech National Road Race Championships in 2022.

Major results

2016
 8th Visegrad 4 Kerékpárverseny
2017
 7th Visegrad 4 Kerékpárverseny
2018
 2nd 
 4th Visegrad 4 Kerékpárverseny
 4th GP Czech Republic
 10th GP Slovakia
2019
 2nd Overall 
 5th GP Slovakia
2021
 3rd Overall Circuit des Ardennes
 8th Memorial Henryka Łasaka
2022
 1st  Road race, National Road Championships
 3rd Memorial Henryka Łasaka
 4th Memoriał Jana Magiery
 6th Overall Tour du Pays de Montbéliard

References

External links
 

1993 births
Living people
Czech male cyclists
Place of birth missing (living people)